Geraldine "Jerrie" Fredritz Mock (November 22, 1925 – September 30, 2014) was an American pilot and the first woman to fly solo around the world. She flew a single engine Cessna 180 (registered N1538C) christened the Spirit of Columbus and nicknamed "Charlie." The trip began March 19, 1964, in Columbus, Ohio, and ended April 17, 1964, in Columbus, Ohio. It took 29 days, 11 hours and 59 minutes, with 21 stopovers and almost . The flight was part of a "race" that developed between Jerrie Mock and Joan Merriam Smith who had flown from a field near San Francisco, CA on March 17, 1964; Smith's departure date and flight path was the same as the aviator Amelia Earhart's last flight. Although they were not in direct competition with each other, media coverage soon began tracking the progress of each pilot, fascinated with who would complete the journey first. Mock was the first to finish. The story of this race is told in a book written by Taylor Phillips entitled, Racing to Greet the Sun, Jerrie Mock and Joan Merriam Smith Duel to Become the First Woman to Solo Around the World (2015). Jerrie Mock was subsequently awarded the Louis Blériot medal from the Fédération Aéronautique Internationale in 1965. In 1970 she published the story of her round-the-world flight in the book Three-Eight Charlie. While that book is now out of print, a 50th anniversary edition was later published including maps, weather charts and photos. Three-Eight Charlie is a reference to the call sign, N1538C, of the Cessna 180 Skywagon Mock used to fly around the world. Before her death, Mock, mother of three children, resided in Quincy, Florida; northwest of the state capital, Tallahassee.

Early life

Geraldine "Jerrie" Fredritz Mock was born on November 22, 1925, in Newark, Ohio to Timothy and Blanche (Wright) Fredritz. Her paternal grandparents were German emigrants. During her childhood, she found that she had more in common with the boys. Her interest for flying was sparked when she was 7 years old when she and her father had the opportunity to fly in the cockpit of a Ford Trimotor airplane. In high school, she took an engineering course in which she was the only girl and decided flying was her passion. She graduated from Newark High School in 1943 and went on to attend Ohio State University. At OSU, she became a member of Phi Mu. She left her studies at OSU to wed her husband, Russell Mock in 1945.

Flight around the world
Mock's flight began and ended at Ohio hometown's Port Columbus Airport; expedition financing included a loan from The Columbus Dispatch newspaper.
 She travelled eastbound, over Morocco, Saudi Arabia, and Vietnam, among other countries. After stressful days traveling over the Atlantic, Mock was greeted by the president of the Aero Club of Morocco and stayed the night in a French home, where Mock reports, "there were no nightmares of thunderheads over the Atlantic. Dressed in red satin, I danced in marble palaces."  Mock later journeyed to Saudi Arabia, where she landed at Dhahran Airport.  In her book Three-Eight Charlie, Mock says that after landing in Saudi Arabia the crowd of men around her looked puzzled. One of the men approached her aircraft. “His white-kaffiyeh-covered head nodded vehemently, and he shouted to the throng that there was no man. This brought a rousing ovation”, she recalled. Mock was quite a spectacle in Saudi Arabia where women would not be allowed to drive cars until 2017, much less fly a plane. In Egypt, she mistakenly landed at a secret off-the-map military base instead of the Cairo Airport. Traveling the world gave Mock a new perspective and experiences. Flying over Vietnam, she noted: "Somewhere not far away a war was being fought, but from the sky above, all looked peaceful."

Accomplishments and recognition

Official world aviation records: 1964–69 
(Sanctioned and accepted by the National Aeronautic Association and the Fédération Aéronautique Internationale)

1964
 Speed around the world, Class C1-c
 Speed around the world, Feminine
1965
 Speed over a closed course of 500 km, Class C1-b
1966
 Distance in a straight line, Feminine
1968
 Distance in a closed course, Class C1-c
 Distance in a closed course, Feminine
 Speed over a recognized course
1969
 Speed over a recognized course

First woman to 
 First woman to fly solo around the world
 First woman to fly around the world in a single-engine plane
 First woman to fly U.S. – Africa via North Atlantic
 First woman to fly the Pacific single-engine
 First woman to fly the Pacific West to East
 First woman to fly both the Atlantic and Pacific
 First woman to fly the Pacific both directions

Awards and honors 

 Federal Aviation Agency Gold Medal for Exceptional Service
 Ohio Governor’s Award
 Louis Bleriot Silver Medal(World-Wide award of Fédération Aéronautique Internationale)
 American Institute of Aeronautics and Astronautics Distinguished Service Award
 Columbus Area Chamber of Commerce Award of the Year
 Experimental Aircraft Association Special Award
 Ohio Aviation Trades Association Sparky Award
 Amelia Earhart Memorial Award, 1964
 Aero Classic Aviation Progress Award, 1965
 National Aviation Trades Association Pilot-of-the-Year Award, 1964
 Glenn Hammond Curtiss Silver Medal, Pittsburgh OX-5 Club
 Milestones in Manned Flight Trophy, Trans World Airlines
 Wadsworth, Ohio, Aero Club Special Award
 Kansas 99’s Special Recognition Medallion
 Special Award of Bexley Civic Association
 Women’s Aero Association of Wichita Award
 Award of Appreciation, Licking County (Ohio
 Columbus Transportation Club Special Award
 Sports Woman of the Year, Columbus Citizen-Journal, 1969
 Citation of Wichita, Kansas, Chamber of Commerce
 September 14, 2013 was declared Jerrie Mock Day by an official proclamation from Newark, Ohio mayor Jeff Hall.

Legacy
A life-size bronze sculpture of Mock, sculpted by Renate Burgyan Fackler, was unveiled in the courtyard of The Works museum in Newark, Ohio on September 14, 2013. Mock's younger sister, Susan Reid, modeled for the statue while wearing Mock's knit skirt, sweater, and leather shoes that she had worn on her round-the-world flight. According to Wendy Hollinger, the publisher who reissued Mock's book about her flight, Mock did not especially like skirts, but "was in a skirt because she thought it would be socially acceptable, especially in the Middle East."

Mock's Cessna 180 which she flew around the world, the Spirit of Columbus, hangs in the National Air and Space Museum of the Smithsonian. In June 2007, Mock flew to Chantilly, Virginia, to see “The Spirit of Columbus” for the first time in many years. Mock "was so pleased to see her plane 'airborne' again". The plane previously was in storage, but with the opening of the Udvar-Hazy Center, is now back on display.

The United States Air Force named a street in honor of Mock at Rickenbacker AFB (presently Rickenbacker Air National Guard Base and Rickenbacker International Airport) in Lockbourne, Ohio (near Columbus).

A plaque bearing Mock's accomplishments can be found in the Tallahassee Regional Airport's Aviation Wall of Fame in Tallahassee, Florida.

In 2022, Mock was inducted into the National Aviation Hall of Fame in Dayton, Ohio.

Death
Mock died in her home in Quincy, Florida and was found by a relative on September 30, 2014. Thanks to the help of a volunteer pilot, she took her final flight in a Cessna 180 as her ashes were returned to the sky.

See also
List of women's firsts
List of American women's firsts
List of firsts in aviation
Circumnavigation
Grace Marguerite Hay Drummond-Hay

Sources

External links

 Jerrie's Cessna 180 at the National Air and Space Museum
 http://www.ctie.monash.edu.au/hargrave/mock.html
  College freshman essay written by Jerrie's granddaughter
  Three-Eight Charlie 50th Anniversary
  BuzzFeed article
  Ohio V. The World Podcast: Jerrie Mock v. the World, October 12, 2019

1925 births
2014 deaths
Aviation pioneers
Aviators from Ohio
People from Quincy, Florida
People from Newark, Ohio
Ohio State University alumni
Writers from Ohio
American women aviators
American people of German descent
21st-century American women